The following outline is provided as an overview of and topical guide to Gibraltar:

Gibraltar – British Overseas Territory located near the southernmost tip of the Iberian Peninsula of Southeastern Europe overlooking the Strait of Gibraltar between the Mediterranean Sea and the North Atlantic Ocean.  The territory shares a border with Spain to the north. Gibraltar was ceded by Spain to Great Britain in perpetuity in 1713 under the Treaty of Utrecht though Spain requests its return. The Government of the United Kingdom has stated it is committed to respecting the wishes of the Gibraltarians, who strongly oppose the idea of annexation along with any proposal for shared sovereignty with Spain.

General reference
 
 Common English country name: Gibraltar
 Official English country name: Gibraltar
 Common endonym(s): List of countries and capitals in native languages None
 Official endonym(s): List of official endonyms of present-day nations and states None
 Adjectival(s): Gibraltar
 Official demonym(s): Gibraltarians
 Unofficial demonym(s): Llanitos
 Etymology: Etymology of Gibraltar
 ISO country codes: GI, GIB, 292
 ISO region codes: See ISO 3166-2:GI
 Internet country code top-level domain: .gi
 International dialing Code: 350

Geography of Gibraltar

Geography of Gibraltar
 Gibraltar is: a British Overseas Territory
 Land boundaries:   
 Coastline: Mediterranean Sea 
 Population of Gibraltar: 28,875
 Area of Gibraltar: 
 Atlas of Gibraltar

Location of Gibraltar
 Gibraltar is situated within the following regions:
 Northern Hemisphere and Western Hemisphere
 Eurasia
 Europe
 Southern Europe
 Iberian Peninsula - near its southernmost tip, overlooking the Strait of Gibraltar
 Time zone:  Central European Time (UTC+01), Central European Summer Time (UTC+02)
 Extreme points of Gibraltar
 High:  Rock of Gibraltar 
 Low: Strait of Gibraltar 0 m

Environment of Gibraltar

 Climate of Gibraltar
 Water supply and sanitation in Gibraltar
 Geology of Gibraltar
 Azores–Gibraltar Transform Fault
 Protected areas of Gibraltar
 Gibraltar Botanic Gardens
 Wildlife of Gibraltar
 Flora of Gibraltar
 Fauna of Gibraltar
 Birds of Gibraltar
 Mammals of Gibraltar
 Reptiles and amphibians of Gibraltar

Natural geographic features of Gibraltar

 Rock of Gibraltar – one of the two Pillars of Hercules
 Bay of Gibraltar
 Sand Dune
 Strait of Gibraltar
 World Heritage Sites in Gibraltar: None, though the entire peninsula was once a proposed World Heritage Site  In May 2012, the Gorham's Cave complex (including Vanguard Cave) made the United Kingdom's short list of sites that have been forwarded for submission to UNESCO.

Regions of Gibraltar

 Westside

Demography of Gibraltar

Demographics of Gibraltar
 Gibraltarians

Government and politics of Gibraltar

 Form of government: parliamentary representative democratic British Overseas Territory
 Capital of Gibraltar: Gibraltar
 Elections in Gibraltar
 1950 Gibraltar general election
 1953 Gibraltar general election
 1956 Gibraltar general election
 1959 Gibraltar general election
 1964 Gibraltar general election
 1969 Gibraltar general election
 1972 Gibraltar general election
 1976 Gibraltar general election
 1980 Gibraltar general election
 1984 Gibraltar general election
 1988 Gibraltar general election
 1992 Gibraltar general election
 1996 Gibraltar general election
 2000 Gibraltar general election
 2003 Gibraltar general election
 2007 Gibraltar general election
 2011 Gibraltar general election
 2015 Gibraltar general election
 2019 Gibraltar general election
 Next Gibraltar general election
 Referendums in Gibraltar
 1967 Gibraltar sovereignty referendum
 2002 Gibraltar sovereignty referendum
 2016 United Kingdom European Union membership referendum
 Political parties in Gibraltar
 Gibraltar Social Democrats
 Gibraltar Socialist Labour Party
 Liberal Party of Gibraltar
 Progressive Democratic Party
 Postal orders of Gibraltar
 Vehicle registration plates of Gibraltar

Executive branch of the government of Gibraltar

 Head of state: Monarch, King Charles III
 Governor: Governor of Gibraltar, Sir David Steel
 Head of government: Chief Minister of Gibraltar, Fabian Picardo

Legislative branch of the government of Gibraltar

 Gibraltar Parliament (unicameral)
Opposition Leader: Peter Caruana

Judicial branch of the government of Gibraltar

Court system of Gibraltar

Foreign relations of Gibraltar
Disputed status of Gibraltar
Sovereignty referendum, 1967
Sovereignty referendum, 2002
 Conservative Friends of Gibraltar
Disputed status of the isthmus
 Spain–United Kingdom relations
 Foreign and Commonwealth Office

International organisation membership
Gibraltar is a member of:
International Criminal Police Organization (Interpol) (subbureau)
European Association of Airport and Seaport Police
Universal Postal Union (UPU)
The International Amateur Radio Union (IARU)

In addition, Gibraltar is a member of a large number of International Sporting organisations.

Law and order in Gibraltar

Law of Gibraltar
Constitution of Gibraltar
Constitution Order 1969
Constitution Order 2006
 Human rights in Gibraltar
 LGBT rights in Gibraltar
 Law enforcement in Gibraltar
 Gibraltar Defence Police
 Royal Gibraltar Police
 Gibraltar passport

Military of Gibraltar

Military of Gibraltar
 Command
 Commander-in-chief: Governor of Gibraltar
 British Forces Gibraltar
 British Forces Gibraltar
 Army of Gibraltar
 Royal Gibraltar Regiment - the territory's permanently based light infantry battalion, consisting of both regular and reserve elements.
 Joint Provost and Security Unit
 Royal Navy Gibraltar Squadron - two Scimitar class patrol boats, HMS Scimitar and HMS Sabre, and three rigid hulled inflatable boats.
 RAF Gibraltar - Gibraltar's military airfield has no resident units, but is utilised as and when required by aircraft on deployment or exercise.
 Gibraltar Defence Police - a civilian police force responsible for enforcing civil law on MoD property in Gibraltar, and is responsible to Commander, British Forces Gibraltar.
 Military history of Gibraltar during World War II

History of Gibraltar

 Ethnic history of Gibraltar
 History of the Jews in Gibraltar
 History of the Maltese in Gibraltar
 Kingdom of Gibraltar
 Military history of Gibraltar
 Battle of Gibraltar
 Siege of Gibraltar (1727)
 Great Siege of Gibraltar
 Military history of Gibraltar during World War II
 History of Nationality

Culture of Gibraltar

Culture of Gibraltar
 Architecture of Gibraltar
 Cuisine of Gibraltar
 Languages of Gibraltar
 Communications in Gibraltar
 Internet in Gibraltar
 National symbols of Gibraltar
 Coat of arms of Gibraltar
 Flag of Gibraltar
 National anthem of Gibraltar
 People of Gibraltar
 Public holidays in Gibraltar
 Gibraltar National Day
 Scouting and Guiding in Gibraltar
 World Heritage Sites in Gibraltar: None, though the entire peninsula is a proposed World Heritage Site

Art in Gibraltar
 Art in Gibraltar
 The Defeat of the Floating Batteries at Gibraltar, September 1782
 The Sortie Made by the Garrison of Gibraltar, 1789
 Music of Gibraltar
 Television in Gibraltar

Religion in Gibraltar

 Christianity in Gibraltar
 Church of England
 Diocese of Gibraltar in Europe
 Bishop of Gibraltar in Europe
 Cathedral of the Holy Trinity, Gibraltar
 Gibraltar Methodist Church
 Catholic Church in Gibraltar
 Roman Catholic Diocese of Gibraltar
 Roman Catholic Bishop of Gibraltar
 Cathedral of St. Mary the Crowned
 Hinduism in Gibraltar
 Islam in Gibraltar
 Judaism in Gibraltar

Sport in Gibraltar

Sport in Gibraltar

 Gibraltar at the Commonwealth Games
 Gibraltar Cricket Association
 Gibraltar national cricket team
 Football in Gibraltar
 Gibraltar Football Association
 Gibraltar Football League
 Football clubs in Gibraltar
 Gibraltar national football team
 Gibraltar national football team records and statistics
 Gibraltar national football team results
 Football venues in Gibraltar
 Victoria Stadium
 Gibraltar at the Olympics: application denied
 Rugby union in Gibraltar

Economy and infrastructure of Gibraltar

Economy of Gibraltar
 Economic rank, by nominal GDP (2007): 164th (one hundred and sixty fourth)
 Banking in Gibraltar
 Banks in Gibraltar
 Communications in Gibraltar
 Internet in Gibraltar
 Internet in Gibraltar
 Media in Gibraltar
 Gibraltar Broadcasting Corporation
 Newspapers in Gibraltar
 Gibraltar Chronicle
 Panorama
 Telephone numbers in Gibraltar
 Royal Gibraltar Post Office
Currency of Gibraltar: Pound
 Coins of the Gibraltar pound
 ISO 4217: GIP
 Gibraltar Stock Exchange
 Health care in Gibraltar
 Gibraltar Health Authority
 Shipping in Gibraltar
 Tourism in Gibraltar
 Footpaths of Gibraltar
 Visa policy of Gibraltar
 Transport in Gibraltar
 Airports in Gibraltar: Gibraltar International Airport is Gibraltar's only airport
 Bus routes in Gibraltar
 Rail transport in Gibraltar
 Roads in Gibraltar
 Streets in Gibraltar
 Water supply and sanitation in Gibraltar

Education in Gibraltar

Education in Gibraltar
List of schools in Gibraltar

Lists
 Gibraltar in popular culture
 List of coats of arms of Gibraltar
 List of flags of Gibraltar
 List of fortifications in Gibraltar

See also

List of international rankings
Outline of Europe
Outline of geography
Outline of the United Kingdom

References

External links

 Maps
 Interactive Map of Gibraltar

 General information
PJHQ Overseas Bases– Gibraltar
Government of Gibraltar
Gibraltar Financial Services Commission
Political comment and live webcam
Gibraltar Ornithological & Natural History Society GONHS
 Gibraltar, CIA Factbook
 Jewish Gibraltar, The Jerusalem Post
WIKI on Gibraltar
 Gibraltar Local Disability Movement

 Culture
Literary Figures with connections to Gibraltar, 1700–1900
Musicians with Gibraltar connections, 1600–1950

 Television, radio and news media
Gibraltar Broadcasting Corporation (with radio streaming)
BFBS - British Forces Broadcasting Gibraltar
Gibfocus
Gibnews

 Newspapers with online editions
The Gibraltar Chronicle
Panorama Daily
VOX - Gibraltar weekly, with site updated daily
The New People

 Image galleries
 Gibraltar Panoramic Tour 360°
Gibraltar Image Databank based in Gibraltar
Gibraltar Photographs
Gibraltarian Photographer
Gibraltar National Day & Landmarks
The Gibraltar Photo Gallery
Photos of Gibraltar
Photos of Gibraltar
Gibraltar Photographers
Straights of Gibraltar

Gibraltar